Boban Babunski (born 5 May 1968) is a Macedonian retired footballer who played as a central defender, and a coach.

Playing career
Babunski was born in Skopje, SR Macedonia, Socialist Federal Republic of Yugoslavia. On the club level he started playing with hometown's FK Vardar, then spent two seasons in Bulgaria with PFC CSKA Sofia to become of the first Macedonians to compete in the A Football Group. After two solid years in the Spanish second division with UE Lleida he played the same time in Japan, at Gamba Osaka.

Babunski retired professionally in 2001 at the age of 33, after stints with AEK Athens FC, CD Logroñés, K. Sint-Truidense V.V. and Chemnitzer FC – he left Germany in December 2000, signing with native FK Rabotnichki – the second and the last teams two also in the respective countries' second level.

Babunski was capped two times for Yugoslavia in 1991. Subsequently, during seven years, he played 23 matches and scored once for the newly formed Macedonia.

Manager career
Babunski began his coaching career as assistant in the Macedonian national side, under Slobodan Santrač. When the latter resigned on 23 August 2005 he was appointed interim manager but, on 17 February of the following year, Srečko Katanec took over the job on a permanent basis.

On 23 July 2009, Babunski was signed as head coach of Macedonian First Football League champions Rabotnichki, also from Skopje, winning the domestic cup in his sole season. Four years later he returned to the national team.

Personal life
Babunski's sons, David and Dorian, are also footballers. The former played youth football with FC Barcelona, whilst the latter did the same at Real Madrid. Babunski's great-grandfather was Jovan Babunski, a Serbian Chetnik vojvoda.

Statistics

Club

National team

References

External links
Profile at MacedonianFootball.com 

Yugoslav national team data 
Macedonian national team data

1968 births
Living people
Footballers from Skopje
Association football central defenders
Yugoslav footballers
Macedonian footballers
Yugoslavia international footballers
North Macedonia international footballers
Dual internationalists (football)
FK Vardar players
PFC CSKA Sofia players
UE Lleida players
Gamba Osaka players
AEK Athens F.C. players
CD Logroñés footballers
Sint-Truidense V.V. players
Chemnitzer FC players
FK Rabotnički players
FK Kožuf players
Yugoslav First League players
First Professional Football League (Bulgaria) players
Segunda División players
J1 League players
Super League Greece players
Belgian Pro League players
2. Bundesliga players
Macedonian First Football League players
Macedonian Second Football League players
Macedonian expatriate footballers
Expatriate footballers in Bulgaria
Macedonian expatriate sportspeople in Bulgaria
Expatriate footballers in Spain
Macedonian expatriate sportspeople in Spain
Expatriate footballers in Japan
Macedonian expatriate sportspeople in Japan
Expatriate footballers in Greece
Macedonian expatriate sportspeople in Greece
Expatriate footballers in Belgium
Macedonian expatriate sportspeople in Belgium
Expatriate footballers in Germany
Macedonian expatriate sportspeople in Germany
Macedonian football managers
North Macedonia national football team managers
FK Rabotnički managers
North Macedonia national under-21 football team managers
FK Vardar managers